The Rapid Action Force ( (FAR)) was an army corps of the French Army, created on 1 July 1984 during the reorganization of the later within the law n°83-606 of 8 July 1983 bearing approbation of the military programming for the years 1984 to 1988; the force would have been in means to deploy in Central-Europe and exterior theatres of operations in case of crisis undergone in intermediary conflicts. The force was dissolved in 1999.

During the 1980s, this army corps was the 3rd pillar of the French Army with the 1st Army and the operational defense of the territory.

The FAR comprised 47,000 men, 240 combat and utility helicopters, 216 armored vehicles (72 AMX 10 RC, 72 ERC-90 and 72 Panhard AML), 200 artillery tubes, 5000 man-portable anti-tank systems and anti-tank missiles in 1990.

Principal formations 

4th Airmobile Division
6th Light Armoured Division
9th Marine Infantry Division
11th Parachute Division
27th Alpine Division
 FAR Logistics Brigade
 19th Artillery Brigade
 28th Transmission regiment

Commandants 

 1984-1985 : général de corps d'armée Gilbert Forray
 1986-1988 : général de corps d'armée Paul Lardry
 1988-xxxx : général de corps d'armée Henry Préaud
 1989-1990 : général de brigade Jacques Vidal
 1990-xxxx : général de corps d'armée Michel Roquejeoffre
 1993-1994 : général de corps d’armée Bertrand Guillaume de Sauville de Lapresle
 1994-1996 : général de corps d'armée Philippe Morillon
 1996-1999 : général de corps d'armée Jacques Bâton

See also
Structure of the French Army in 1989

References

Bibliography 
 Olivier Latremoliere, La force d'action rapide, Midev, 1993. 
 Général Henri Préaud, « La force d'action rapide », in Les Cahiers de Mars n° 120, 1989

Army units and formations of France
Military units and formations established in 1984
Military units and formations disestablished in 1999